John Edward (or Edmund) Owens (2 April 1823 in Liverpool – 7 December 1886 in Maryland) was an English-American comedian, born in the Aigburth district of Liverpool, England but taken to the United States when three years old.  He began his stage career in 1841 in Philadelphia.

Owens was a popular comedian whose regular repertory included about fifty parts and who earned a fortune. His Solon Shingle (1864) was famous both in the United States and in England; among his other favorite characters were Dr. Pangloss (in George Colman the Younger's The Heir at Law), Caleb Plummer in stage adaptations of Charles Dickens's The Cricket on the Hearth,  and the old man (Elbert Rogers) in Esmeralda, in which he last appeared in New York. He was both humorist and comedian. John E. Owens, describing the conduct of a bee in an empty molasses barrel, once threw a circle of his hearers almost into convulsions of laughter. He died at his home, Aigburth Vale near Towson, Maryland, 7 December 1886.

Owens was the first East Coast actor to tour to San Francisco's California Theatre in 1869 after completion. He then made an arduous journey to perform in Virginia City in his most popular productions. According to Owens' wife, he found the mining camp theater inadequate to stage his productions.

References

Winter The Wallet of Time (New York, 1913)

 

American male stage actors
American male comedians
English male stage actors
English male comedians
1824 births
1886 deaths
British emigrants to the United States
Comedians from Liverpool
19th-century American male actors